The 1992 BP Nationals was a men's tennis tournament played on outdoor hard courts in Wellington in New Zealand that was part of the World Series of the 1992 ATP Tour. It was the fifth edition of the tournament and was held from 30 December 1991 through 5 January 1992. Unseeded Jeff Tarango won the singles title.

Finals

Singles
 Jeff Tarango defeated  Alexander Volkov 6–1, 6–0, 6–3
 It was Tarango's 1st singles title of his career.

Doubles
 Jared Palmer /  Jonathan Stark defeated  Michiel Schapers /  Daniel Vacek 6–3, 6–3

See also
 1992 Fernleaf Butter Classic – women's tournament

References

External links
 ITF tournament edition details

BP National Championships
BP National Championships
January 1992 sports events in New Zealand
BP